is a 1998 novel, written by Japanese author Kaoru Ohno about a group of Japanese holdouts on the island of Anatahan in the Pacific Ocean.  The Anatahan holdouts had also inspired a 1953 film, Anatahan.

Plot

During the Pacific War, after three Japanese supply ships are sunk off the shore of Anatahan, the survivors are taken in by Kikuichiro Higa and Kuzuko, his live-in wife, who have a small coconut plantation on the island. Commanding officer, Sgt. Junzo Itami, tries to maintain discipline, but as the group endures U.S. airstrikes and food shortages order begins to break down. Soon the men become obsessed with Kazuko, the lone woman on the island, and a vicious dynamic sets in among the survivors.

Characters
 Kikuichiro Higa – the Okinawan owner of a small coconut plantation on the island.
 Kazuko Higa – Kikuichiro's common-law wife.
 Junzo Itami – an Imperial Japanese Navy sergeant who becomes the group's commanding officer after they are shipwrecked on the island.
 James B. Johnson – a United States Navy captain tasked with coaxing the surviving Japanese on Anatahan out of hiding.

Reception
The novel received a favorable review from Tim Hornyak in The Japan Times.

English-language editions
 Kaoru Ohno, Cage on the Sea (Zekkai Misshitsu), translated by Giles Murray, 1st hardback ed., Austin, TX : Bento Books, Inc., 1998, 420 p.

References

External links
Review by Kirkus Reviews

1998 novels
Japanese-language novels
Northern Mariana Islands culture
Novels set in Oceania